UM-Motorcycles (United Motors) is an American motorcycle manufacturer headquartered in Miami. UM was formed in the early 2000s by Octavio Villegas Llano. The company has a distribution network in 25 nations with 1200 outlets. It also entered the European market during the 2016 Intermot, and its European operations are based out of Porto.

History
UM Motorcycles has its origins in Colombia, and has been claiming U.S. roots to project a favourable world image. United Motors (UM) was founded in Colombia in 1951, importing and distributing cars, trucks and heavy equipment from the U.S. and Japan into Latin America, primarily in Colombia. Recognizing growing demand for motorcycle products worldwide, UM entered the powersports market in the early '90s by forging agreements with large motorcycle manufacturers in China and Taiwan to introduce those products to the Latin American market. In 1997, UM ventured in to the U.S. (as "Jincheng USA") to distribute products from various manufacturers in China under the UM brand name. In 2005, UM started selling rebadged Hyosung Motorcycles under agreement with S&T Motors. On Feb 1, 2010, UM ceased US operations, and Martin Racing Performance acquired all of UM's remaining assets from banks that held the liens on the company. After closing the U.S. distribution operations, UM continued doing business in Colombia and in other Latin American markets. In 2014, UM announced their entry to India through an Indian subsidiary, UM Motorcycles, marketing themselves as an "American Manufacturer" with origins in the U.S.

Joint Ventures
UM Motors entered the Indian market (which accounts for 78 percentage of the global two-wheeler demand) with a 50:50 joint venture with Lohia Auto. It has invested 100 crores in a plant at Kashipur, Uttarakhand capable of producing 5000 units a month, and is headquartered in New Delhi. The brand retails in India under the UM Lohia brand name and started operations in 2016. The company has rolled out two 280 cc cruiser motorcycles in India – Renegade Commando and Renegade Sport S and currently has 75 dealerships.

The UM Lohia venture will also export motorcycles to Nepal, besides other South Asian markets. The current level of localisation is 60 percentage with engines and fuel tanks being imported. Karan Singh Grover is the brand ambassador for the UM Lohia venture.

This venture ended because of poor after sales by the company in India as the spare parts were not good and a case were running in India. All service centers across India have been closed.

Technical Collaborations
In 2016, Runner Automobiles of Bangladesh signed a collaboration agreement with UM to manufacture UM motorcycles in Bangladesh under the name of UM-Runner . The motorcycles will be manufactured at Runner's motorcycle manufacturing facilities at Bhaluka while UM International LLC will provide R&D support in technological & engineering fields as well as global component sourcing. Bangladeshi manufactured UM-Runner motorcycles entered the market in the second quadrant of 2018. As per of the agreement Runner Automobiles in future will produce and export bikes for UM for  Nepal and Sri Lanka.

Technology
UM has a range of patented innovative features coupled with its bikes. CASH (Communication Awareness System Helmet) is a technology to connect the helmet to communicate via Bluetooth with the UM Motorcycle. KAS (Keyless Alarm System) is a system to recognise the UM bike owner's presence within 1.2 metres of the bike, and subsequently start the bike without a key. BSM (Blind Spot Mirror System) is a system where the rear view mirrors have a section on the outer corner with a blind spot mirror, allowing the rider to spot vehicles in the blind spot area.

References

External links 
UM Motorcycles International website

Motorcycle manufacturers of the United States
Motor vehicle manufacturers based in Florida
Motorcycles by brand